The governor of Batangas is the local chief executive of the Philippine province of Batangas.  The governor holds office at the Batangas Provincial Capitol in Batangas City and its residence is at the People's Mansion located at the Provincial Government Complex. Like all local government heads in the Philippines, the governor is elected via popular vote, and may not be elected for a fourth consecutive term (although the former governor may return to office after an interval of one term). In case of death, resignation or incapacity, the vice governor becomes the governor. Along with the governors of Cavite, Laguna, Quezon and Rizal, he sits in the Regional Development Council of the Calabarzon Region.

List of Governors

References

Government of Batangas
Governors of provinces of the Philippines